American singer Stacey Q has released five studio albums, one compilation album, one extended play, thirteen singles, four promotional singles, and six music videos. Born Stacey Swain, she first served as the lead singer of the band SSQ put together by producer Jon St. James.

Swain first began to work on solo material in 1985. She continued her collaboration with St. James and SSQ's original line-up. Her self-titled EP was released by On the Spot Records. Shortly after its release, Swain got signed by Atlantic Records and released her debut studio album Better Than Heaven (1986). It debuted at number fifty-nine on the US Billboard 200 and was certified gold in the United States. The first single released from the album was  "Two of Hearts", which was praised by critics and was a commercial success. It peaked at number three on the Billboard Hot 100 and became one of the highest-selling singles of 1986. The second single, "We Connect" was also successful, peaking at number thirty-five on the Hot 100 chart. "Insecurity" and "Music Out of Bounds" were also released as singles but did not perform as well as its predecessors.

Swain released her second album Hard Machine in February 1988. It spawned two singles; "I Love You" and "Don't Make a Fool of Yourself". Her third album Nights Like This (1989) marked a musical departure from her previous material. Drawing influence mostly from house and freestyle music, received positive reviews from music critics. However, it was a commercial failure and became Swain's first album not to reach the Billboard 200.

Albums

Studio albums

Compilation albums

Extended plays

Singles

As lead artist

Promotional singles

Videography

Music videos

References

External links
 
 
 
 

Discographies of American artists
Pop music discographies